Bahram Mirza was a Safavid prince, governor of Khorasan, Gilan and Hamadan. He is also known to be a calligrapher, painter, poet, musician and patron of arts.

Life 
He was born in 1517 to Ismail I and his Turcoman wife Tajlu Khanum in meadows of Surluq near Maragha, a place Ismail loved to spend time as his youngest son. He was a full brother of future shah Tahmasp I. His public service started in 1530 when he was just 13 years old by an appointment to Khorasan governorate with Ghazi Khan Takalu as his guardian or lala with capital province of Herat. This experience proved very hard for the young prince as he had to face Ubaydullah Khan of Shaybanids. However, as soon as Ubaydullah retreated, Tahmasp arrived in Khorasan in 1533 to fight against Uzbeks. Bahram accompanied his brother in central flank in the battle near Jam. However, since Takalu contingents fled from the battle, governorship of Khorasan was revoked from Ghazi Khan Takalu and Bahram Mirza by Tahmasp, who granted it to another brother Sam Mirza.

He participated in Ottoman-Safavid war with Alqas Mirza in 1534 where he proved his military valour. After a while, he was named governor of Gilan by Tahmasp who planned to annex lands of Karkiya Hasan (father of Khan Ahmad Khan). However, he couldn't manage to impose central authority and fled to Qazvin after a while. According to Colin Mitchell, this led to disapproval of his brother.

His next appointment was to governorate of Hamadan in 1546. This was also the place where he started to support many artists including Dust Muhammad, Rustam Ali (nephew of Kamāl ud-Dīn Behzād) and Budaq Monshi Qazvini. He joined yet another war later, this time against his half-brother Alqas who was supporter by Ottoman Empire. However, Alqas sacked Hamadan while capturing Bahram's family too. It was Bahram who obtained surrender of Alqas in 1549 in Marivan. He died on 11 October 1549.

Family 
Bahram's only known wife was Zaynab Sultan Khanum, sister of certain Imaduddin Shirvani. She was the mother of his son, Ibrahim Mirza. She died at Qazvin in October 1570, and was buried in Mashhad. Had at least three sons:
 Hussayn Mirza (d. 1576) — Governor of Sistan (1555-1557), Kandahar (1557-1576), Zamindawar and Garmsir (1558-1566)
 Ibrahim Mirza — Governor of Mashhad (1555-1562/1565-1567), Ardabil (1562), Qa’en (1562-1565), Sabzawar (1567-1574), Grand Master of Ceremonies (1574-1577) and Keeper of the Royal Real (Mohrdār) (1576-1577)
 Badi-al Zaman Mirza Safavi — Governor of Sistan (1558-1577)

References

Further reading 
 

Safavid princes
1549 deaths
1517 births
16th-century painters of Safavid Iran
Safavid governors in Gilan
Safavid governors of Hamadan
People from Maragheh
16th-century calligraphers of Safavid Iran
Burials in Mashhad